Ramishvili is a Georgian surname. Notable people with the surname include:
Isidore Ramishvili (1859–1937), Georgian Social Democratic politician and journalist
Levan Ramishvili (born 1973), Georgian politician
Nino Ramishvili (1910–2000), Georgian dancer
Noe Ramishvili (1881–1930), Georgian politician
Teimuraz Ramishvili (born 1955), Russian diplomat of Georgian origin

Surnames of Georgian origin
Georgian-language surnames